The State Archives of Montenegro (Državi arhiv Crne Gore) are the national archives of the country of Montenegro, located in its historic capital of Cetinje. The archives were established in 1951, while their history can be traced back to the late 19th century. Its director is Sasa Tomanovic.

External links 
 State Archives of Montenegro

Montenegro
Montenegrin culture
Cetinje